Gabi Habetz is a German former professional racing cyclist. She won the German National Road Race Championship in 1981.

References

External links
 

Year of birth missing (living people)
Living people
German female cyclists
People from Pulheim
Sportspeople from Cologne (region)
Cyclists from North Rhine-Westphalia